Kapellet Canyon is a canyon with steep rock and ice walls indenting the eastern side of Jøkulkyrkja Mountain, in the Mühlig-Hofmann Mountains of Queen Maud Land. It was plotted from surveys and aerial photographs by the Sixth Norwegian Antarctic Expedition (1956–60) and named Kapellet (the chapel).

See also
 History of Antarctica
 List of Antarctic expeditions

References

External links
 Scientific Committee on Antarctic Research (SCAR)

Canyons and gorges of Antarctica
Landforms of Queen Maud Land
Princess Astrid Coast